John Steinbeck House may refer to:

John Steinbeck House (Monte Sereno, California), listed on the National Register of Historic Places in Santa Clara County, California
John Steinbeck House (Salinas, California), listed on the National Register of Historic Places in Monterey County, California